The following are organisations and institutions associated with but not part of the University of Cambridge.

Student organisations
 Cambridge SCA
 Cambridge University Air Squadron
 Cambridge University Students' Union (CUSU)
 Cambridge Union

Other
 Auto-ID Labs
 Cambridge Crystallographic Data Centre
 Cambridge Network — Cambridge University industry networking
 Coimbra Group
 Granta - literary magazine founded by Cambridge students
 League of European Research Universities
 The Naked Scientists – science radio show and podcasts created by Cambridge University scientists
 Phoenix
 Russell Group
 Universities' Mission to Central Africa, a 19–20th-century mission society established at Cambridge
 Westminster Quarters

See also 
 List of social activities at the University of Cambridge

 
University of Cambridge
University of Cambridge-related lists